Lu Tong (790–835), pseudonym Yuchuanzi, was a  Chinese poet of the Tang dynasty, known for his lifelong study of Chinese tea culture. He never became an official, and is better known for his love of tea than his poetry.

Biography 
Lu Tong, also called by the self-ascribed art name Yuchuanzi, was from the city of Jiyuan in the Chinese province of Henan.

Poetry 
Lu Tong's Seven Bowls of Tea (（唐. 790~835）):

(Steven R. Jones 2008)

Penglai Island, or Mount Penglai, is a mythologic island where the immortals lived.

See also
 The Classic of Tea
 Tea
 History of tea in China
 Tea Classics

References

Works cited 
“Chinese-English Tea Studies Terminology”, (2010), Lu-Yu Tea Culture Institute, Co., Ltd, 
 Lu Tong poem
 The Seven Cups of Tea, in English and Chinese

External links 
Books of the Quan Tangshi that include collected poems of Lu Tong at the Chinese Text Project:
Book 387
Book 388
Book 389

790 births
835 deaths
9th-century Chinese poets
Lu clan of Fanyang
Poets from Henan
Tang dynasty poets
Writers from Jiyuan